Beldiceanu is a Romanian surname. Notable people with the surname include:

Ioan Beldiceanu, Romanian general in World War II
Nicolae Beldiceanu, Romanian poet and novelist
Nicolae N. Beldiceanu, Romanian short story writer and son of Nicolae

Romanian-language surnames